Charlestown-Bellahy is a census town split between County Mayo and County Sligo in Ireland. It comprises the adjoining villages of Charlestown, County Mayo, and  Bellahy, County Sligo, had a population of 753 at the 2002 census.

References

Towns and villages in County Mayo
Towns and villages in County Sligo
Twin cities
Articles on towns and villages in Ireland possibly missing Irish place names